(-)-1-Phenyl-2-propylaminopentane (also known as (-)-PPAP and N,α-dipropylphenethylamine) is a stimulant of the substituted phenethylamine class and a derivative of Selegiline. When compared with Selegiline and other substituted phenethylamines (-)-PPAP has a notably different mechanism of action and pharmacological effect.

(-)-PPAP is classified as a monoaminergic activity enhancer that stimulates the impulse propagation mediated transmitter release of the neurotransmitters dopamine, norepinephrine and serotonin in the brain. Unlike stimulants such as amphetamine, which release a flood of monoamine neurotransmitters in an uncontrolled manner, (-)-PPAP instead only increases the amount of neurotransmitters that get released when a neuron is stimulated by receiving an impulse from a neighbouring neuron. Both amphetamine and (-)-PPAP promote the release of monoamines and deuteramines, however while amphetamine causes neurons to dump neurotransmitter stores into the synapse regardless of external input, (-)-PPAP does not influence the pattern of neurotransmitter release and instead releases a larger amount of neurotransmitters than normal.

(-)-PPAP has no monoamine oxidase inhibitory activity.

See also 
 (-)-BPAP
 MBDP
 Pentedrone

References 

Stimulants
Phenethylamines
Designer drugs
Substituted amphetamines